Brian Douglas Cummings (born March 4, 1948) is an American voice actor, known for his work in radio and television commercials, television and motion picture promos, cartoons and as the announcer on The All-New Let's Make a Deal from 1984 to 1985.

Life and career
Having begun the pursuit of his chosen career at a local radio station (KSDN) in Aberdeen, South Dakota, during his senior year in high school, Brian set his sights high and has continued to "talk" a lot.

Brian was the closing announcer for ALF in syndication, and he, along with Mark Elliott, has also been one of the long-time voices of Buena Vista Home Entertainment (now Walt Disney Studios Home Entertainment) trailers and promotions. He also did some narrations for some Columbia Tristar Home Video trailers, but is perhaps more known for his extensive work for Paramount Home Video.

Cummings has performed on multiple animated series since the 1980s. Among his most famous roles are those of Dimmy in The Snorks, Morton Fizzback and Professor Funt in Denver, the Last Dinosaur, Mr. Hollywood in 2 Stupid Dogs, Doctor Mindbender in G.I. Joe, Clyde Cat in Tom and Jerry Kids, Papa Q. Bear in The Berenstain Bears, Doofus Drake in DuckTales and he can also be heard as the voice of Sokolov in the Metal Gear Solid video games.

Personal life
Cummings is married to his wife Carla; together they have eight children.

Filmography

Animation

Theatrical films
Jetsons: The Movie (1990) – Movie Announcer
Beauty and the Beast (1991) – The Stove
FernGully: The Last Rainforest (1992) – Ock

Direct-to-video films
 G.I. Joe: The Movie (1987) – Doctor Mindbender
 A Flintstones Christmas Carol (1994) – Ghost of Christmas Present
 Scooby-Doo! in Arabian Nights (1994) – Sultan
 Annabelle's Wish (1997) – Brewster
 K10C: Kids' Ten Commandments (2003 film series) – Aron, God, Raca

Television
Spider-Man (1981) – ESU Principal (in "The Pied Piper of New York Town"), General (in "The Pied Piper of New York Town")
The Little Rascals (1982) – Captain Smokey (in "Cap'n Spanky's Showboat")
Snorks (1984) – Dimmy Finster
G.I. Joe: A Real American Hero (1986) – Doctor Mindbender
2 Stupid Dogs (1993–1995) – Mr. Hollywood
Animaniacs – Announcer (ep. Smell Ya Later 1994)
Les Dalton (2010–2012) – William Dalton
We Wish You a Merry Walrus (2014) – Merry Walrus

Video games
Tron: Solar Sailer (1982) – MCP
The Mark of Kri (2002) – Baumusu
Metal Gear Solid 3: Snake Eater (2004) – Sokolov
Metal Gear Solid: Portable Ops (2006) – Sokolov, Ghost
Sekiro: Shadows Die Twice (2019) – Sculptor

Live-action
Hughes and Harlow: Angels in Hell (1977) – Assistant Director
California Suite (1978) – Autograph Seeker
Where the Buffalo Roam (1980) – Richard Nixon (voice)
ALF (1986) – Announcer (TV promos and closing for syndicated reruns)
The All-New Let's Make a Deal (1984–1985) – Announcer
Fun House (1988) – Announcer (pilot episode only)
 Pikes Peak By Rail (1991) – Narrator
Good Burger (1997) – Announcer (Trailers and promos)
Most Shocking (2006–2010) – Announcer
Most Daring (2007–2010) – Announcer
Transformers: Revenge of the Fallen (2009) – Announcer (for RPMs Toy Promo)

References

External links

Brian Cummings at Voice Chasers

1948 births
Living people
Male actors from South Dakota
Male actors from Los Angeles
American male radio actors
American male voice actors
Game show announcers
People from Sioux Falls, South Dakota
Disney people
Paramount Global people